Aidan Turner (born 19 June 1983) is an Irish actor. He played the roles of Ross Poldark in the 2015–2019 BBC adaptation of The Poldark Novels by Winston Graham, Dante Gabriel Rossetti in Desperate Romantics, Ruairí McGowan in The Clinic, and John Mitchell in the supernatural drama series Being Human. He played Kíli in The Hobbit film series (2012–2014).

Early life
Turner was born at home in Clondalkin, a suburban town of Dublin. The family moved later to Walkinstown. Turner attended secondary school at St Mac Dara's Community College in Templeogue before leaving to join his older brother at Firhouse Community College. Turner has stated: "I probably wasn't a great student. I had a car when I was 17, so I used to just run out of school when I could, jump in the car and go play pool in Tallaght. I don't know how I knew, but I convinced myself that my [final exam] results were never going to matter to me."

Before becoming an actor, Turner was a successful ballroom dancer, once obtaining third place in the adult section of the Irish National Championships. After finishing secondary school, he briefly worked as an apprentice electrician, alongside his father. After he saw a notice up in Dublin's Gaiety School of Acting, and having become interested in acting while working in a cinema, he applied. He graduated from the Gaiety School of Acting in 2004.

Career
After graduating, Turner appeared in several theatre plays, including The Plough and the Stars, Romeo and Juliet, and A Cry from Heaven.

Turner's television acting career began in 2007 with an uncredited appearance on the first episode of The Tudors. In the same year he produced and starred in the film Porcelain, directed by Gavin Cleland, which was shot in a convent in Dublin. However only a trailer of the movie was ever released. Between 2008 and 2009, he appeared in a recurring role on The Clinic. Appearing in 18 episodes as Ruairí McGowan, he followed The Clinic with a BBC production, Desperate Romantics. He portrayed Dante Gabriel Rossetti in all six episodes of the show, which aired in 2009. Turner played the vampire John Mitchell on the supernatural drama programme Being Human during the first three series from 2009 to 2011, for which he received widespread praise.

His film career began with two short films, The Sound of People and Matterhorn, both in 2007. He later played Mal in the thriller feature film Alarm (2008).

His role on Being Human brought Turner to the attention of Sir Peter Jackson, who cast him as the dwarf Kíli in The Hobbit trilogy (2012–2014). In 2014, he won the Empire Award for Best Male Newcomer for the second film in the series, The Desolation of Smaug, which had been released the previous year. In 2013, he also played shadowhunter-turned-werewolf Luke Garroway in The Mortal Instruments: City of Bones.

In the 2015 BBC TV miniseries And Then There Were None, based on the Agatha Christie novel, he plays the cynical mercenary Philip Lombard.

Turner performed the title role of Ross Poldark in the 2015 revival of the BBC series. At the National Television Awards ceremony in 2016, Turner was presented with the "Impact Award" for his performance in Poldark.

Personal life 
In 2017, Turner met actress Caitlin FitzGerald. They married in August 2020, and FitzGerald gave birth to their child in January 2022.

Filmography

Film

Television

Theatre

Awards and nominations

References

External links

 

1983 births
21st-century Irish male actors
Irish male film actors
Irish male television actors
Living people
People from Clondalkin